Ria Bancroft (1907 – 8 March 1993) was a British-New Zealand artist born in England. She created the Tabernacle Screen Doors for Cathedral of the Blessed Sacrament in Christchurch and her works are held in several New Zealand art galleries.

Background 
Born in England, in 1907, she moved to Canada to work as a television designer and display artist She moved Italy in the 1960s to study art, receiving a Diploma from the Academy of Florence. In 1962 she moved to New Zealand, joining her daughter Peb Simmons in Christchurch. Bancroft died on 8 March 1993 in Christchurch, New Zealand.

Career 
After studying art in Italy, it was only after moving to New Zealand that Bancroft began to focus on her sculpture work. Her work often included religious subjects.

Bancroft became a member of the Canterbury Society of Arts and exhibited with The Group in 1963, 1965, 1966, 1967, 1968, 1969, 1973, 1974, 1975, 1976, and 1977. In 1964 she was invited to join the New Zealand Society of Sculptors. During this time she also exhibited with the New Zealand Academy of Fine Arts

After receiving recognition for her work, Bancroft became increasingly involved in art education and delivered a number of talks and lectures. In 1971 she accepted a position as art teacher at Xavier College, a boys' High School. In 1974 she resigned the position to focus on her art.

In addition to her public works, notable works by Ban include Rocking Horse (1963) and Unicycle No 2. Her final piece, a life size portrait of the Russian writer Alexander Solzhenitsyn, was completed in 1992.

In 1998 the Robert McDougall Art Gallery held a posthumous exhibition of Bancroft's work entitled, Ria Bancroft: Three Decades of Sculpture. A biography of her life, No Ordinary Woman: A Biography of Ria Bancroft, was written by her daughter Peb Simmons.

Her work is held in the collection of the Suter Te Aratoi O Whakatū gallery and Christchurch Art Gallery Te Puna o Waiwhetu.

Public works 
Bancroft received many public commissions in New Zealand including:
 Horizon – her first major commission, for the Christchurch City Council in 1965, it incorporated in the design of the new 'Horizon' restaurant at Christchurch International Airport
 Forms – 9-metre-long mural, made in collaboration with Pat Mulcahy, for the Ministry of Works and was incorporated in the design of the University of Canterbury's new Science Lecture Hall
 mural for the New Zealand Broadcasting Corporation building in Rotorua, created in 1966 in collaboration with Pat Mulcahy
 a maquette "Angel of St Matthew" – for Saint Matthew’s Catholic Church in 1967
  the Tabernacle Screen Doors for Christchurch’s Cathedral of the Blessed Sacrament in 1975, opened 12 June 1977
 Thy Kingdom Come – commissioned for the Holy Cross Chapel in Christchurch in the 1970s
 ‘Christus Rex’ memorial cross for All Saints' Church in Dunedin – completed in 1990
Her work, Energetic Forms, 1965–1966, created with Pat Mulcahy is included in the University of Canterbury sculpture trail.

In the 1980s she assisted in the refurbishment of St Mary’s Catholic church in New Brighton (where she attended) with sculptor Bing Dawe. In addition to work on the altar, lectern, font, and sanctuary, Bancroft created and gifted a sculpture of the Virgin Mary to the church.

References

Further reading 
Artist files for Ria Bancroft are held at:
 Angela Morton Collection, Takapuna Library
 E. H. McCormick Research Library, Auckland Art Gallery Toi o Tāmaki
 Robert and Barbara Stewart Library and Archives, Christchurch Art Gallery Te Puna o Waiwhetu
 Hocken Collections Uare Taoka o Hākena
 Te Aka Matua Research Library, Museum of New Zealand Te Papa Tongarewa
Also see:
 Concise Dictionary of New Zealand Artists McGahey, Kate (2000) Gilt Edge

1907 births
1983 deaths
Artists from Christchurch
New Zealand sculptors
New Zealand women artists
People associated with the Canterbury Society of Arts
People associated with The Group (New Zealand art)